Miguel Pedro Mundo (July 25, 1937 – May 18, 1999) was an American-born bishop of the Catholic Church in Brazil. In the Diocese of Jataí, he served as Auxiliary Bishop from 1978 to 1999, then Bishop of Jataí for the last three months of his life.

Biography
Born in Staten Island, New York, Mundo was ordained a priest on May 19, 1962, for the Diocese of Camden in New Jersey.

On March 6, 1978, Pope Paul VI appointed him as the Titular Bishop of Blanda Julia and Auxiliary Bishop of Jataí.  He was consecrated by Bishop George Guilfoyle of Camden on June 2, 1978. The principal co-consecrators were Bishop Benedict D. Coscia, O.F.M., of Jataí and Camden Auxiliary Bishop James Schad.

Pope John Paul II appointed Mundo to succeed Coscia as Bishop of Jataí on February 24, 1999.  He died three months later on May 18, 1999, at the age of 61.

References

1937 births
1999 deaths
People from Staten Island
American Roman Catholic missionaries
20th-century Roman Catholic bishops in Brazil
20th-century American Roman Catholic titular bishops
Burials in Goiás
Roman Catholic missionaries in Brazil
American expatriates in Brazil
Catholics from New York (state)
Roman Catholic bishops of Jataí